This article represents the structure of the Royal Netherlands Air Force as of May 2020:

Commander of the Royal Netherlands Air Force 
  Commander of the Royal Netherlands Air Force
  Air Force Command Staff, in Breda
 Operations Directorate
 Operation Centre, in The Hague
 Materiel Logistic Maintenance Directorate 
 Personnel and Management Directorate

Air Combat Command (ACC) 

  Volkel Air Base
  312 Squadron, with F-16AM Falcon
  313 Squadron, with F-35A Lightning II
  640 Squadron (Air base operations)
  900 Squadron (Maintenance)
  901 Squadron (Logistic support)
 Tactical Air Reconnaissance Centre
Volkel Air Base is one of two Royal Netherlands Air Force F-16AM Falcon bases, which are being replaced by F-35A Lightning II. As part of NATO's nuclear sharing the US Air Force's 703rd Munitions Support Squadron, 52nd Fighter Wing stores B61 tactical nuclear weapons at Volkel for use with Dutch F-16AM Falcon.

  Leeuwarden Air Base
  322 Squadron, with 15x F-35A Lightning II
  306 Squadron, with 4x MQ-9 Reaper
  920 Squadron (Maintenance)
  921 Squadron (Logistic support)
  922 Squadron (Air base operations)
Leeuwarden Air Base is one of two Royal Netherlands Air Force F-16AM Falcon bases, which are being replaced by F-35A Lightning II, the first of which arrived at Leeuwarden on 31 October 2019

  Air Operations Control Station Nieuw-Milligen, in Nieuw-Milligen
  710 Squadron (operates the Control and Command Centre (CRC)
  711 Squadron, at Schiphol Airport (operates the Military Air Traffic Control Centre (MilATCC)
  970 Squadron (Logistics, engineering, and base services)
  Air Control School
  National Data Link Management Cell
 Radar Station South, in Nieuw-Milligen, with SMART-L GB
 Radar Station North, in Wier, with SMART-L GB
Air Operations Control Station Nieuw-Milligen (AOCS NM) is part of the NATO Integrated Air Defense System and monitors and secures the Dutch part of NATO airspace. The centre reports to Air Operations Centre Uedem (NATO CAOC Uedem) in Uedem, Germany.

Air Mobility Command (AMC) 
Eindhoven Air Base is home to all transport and aerial refueling aircraft of the Royal Netherlands Air Force. Furthermore NATO's Multi Role Tanker Transport Capability (MRTT-C) is based at Eindhoven.

  Eindhoven Air Base
  334 Squadron, with 1x Gulfstream IV, 5x A330 MRTT, and 2x Dornier 228-212 flown for the Netherlands Coastguard
  336 Squadron, with 2x C-130H Hercules, 2x C-130H-30 Hercules
  940 Squadron (Logistic support)
  941 Squadron (Air base operations)
  942 Squadron (Maintenance)
 Movement Coordination Centre Europe
 European Air Transport Command
 Multi Role Tanker Transport Capability

Defense Helicopter Command (DHC) 

The Defense Helicopter Command at Gilze-Rijen Air Base consists of all helicopter units of the Armed forces of the Netherlands. The air force's SERE School is also located at Gilze-Rijen Air Base.

  Defense Helicopter Command, at Gilze-Rijen Air Base
  298 Squadron, with 16x CH-47F Chinook
  299 Squadron (Helicopter air and ground crew training)
  300 Squadron, with 12x AS 532U2 Cougar Mk2
  301 Squadron, with 20x AH-64E Apache
  302 Squadron, at Fort Hood in Texas, with 8x AH-64E Apache and 4x CH-47F Chinook
  930 Squadron (Maintenance)
  931 Squadron (Air base operations)
 De Kooy Airfield, Royal Netherlands Navy helicopter base
  7 Squadron (NH90 air and ground crew training), with NH90 NFH, and NH90 TTH
  860 Squadron, with NH90 NFH helicopters
  990 Squadron (Maintenance)
 Deelen Air Base, no flying units, regularly used for joint exercises with the Royal Netherlands Army's 11th Airmobile Brigade

Air Force Reserve Group 
The Air Force Reserve Group was established in November 2004 and fell under the Defense Helicopter Command. Since 2019 the group is an independent formation.

  Air Force Reserve Group, in Breda
  519 Squadron, at Air Operations Control Station Nieuw-Milligen
 1st Flight at Leeuwarden Air Base, 2nd and 3rd Flight at AOCS Nieuw-Milligen, 4th and 5th Flight at Volkel Air Base
  520 Squadron, at Gilze-Rijen Air Base
 6th Flight at Eindhoven Air Base, 7th and 8th Flight at Gilze-Rijen Air Base, 9th Flight at Woensdrecht Air Base

Royal Netherlands Air Force Military School-Woensdrecht Air Base 

The Royal Netherlands Air Force Military School at Woensdrecht Air Base is the training institute for all Royal Netherlands Air Force personnel, except officer candidates, which are trained at the Royal Military Academy. The base also houses a Fire Fighting Exercise and Training Centre, and the Joint Meteorological Group, which provides meteorological services to all branches of the Armed forces of the Netherlands.

  Royal Netherlands Air Force Military School-Woensdrecht Air Base
  130 Squadron (Military training)
  131 Squadron (Basic military aviator training), with 13x PC-7 Turbo Trainer planes
  133 Squadron (Basic technical training)
  961 Squadron (Air base operations)
  Joint Meteorological Group
 Fire Fighting Exercise and Training Centre

Woensdrecht Logistic Centre 
The Woensdrecht Logistic Centre provides second level maintenance for all aircraft of the Royal Netherlands Air Force.

  Woensdrecht Logistic Centre, at Woensdrecht Air Base
  980 Squadron (Aircraft maintenance)
  981 Squadron (Components maintenance)
  982 Squadron (Technology and mission support)
  983 Squadron (Logistics, manages the air force's central inventory)

People and Aviation Centre 
The People and Aviation Centre in Soesterberg is the air force's research, selection, aviation medicine, psychology and physiology centre.

  People and Aviation Centre, in Soesterberg

Squadrons assigned to other commands 
The following Royal Netherlands Air Force squadrons are assigned to other commands:

  Royal Netherlands Army
  Joint Ground-based Air Defense Command, in Vredepeel
  800 Squadron (Support)
  802 Squadron, with MIM-104 Patriot long range surface-to-air missiles

 Royal Military Academy, in Breda
  Cadets Squadron
  121 Squadron (Military Scientific Training)
  122 Squadron (Basic Officer Training)

Air Force structure graphic

Geographic distribution of units

References

External links
 Website of the Royal Netherlands Air Force

Structure of contemporary air forces